Panjab is district in the central part of Bamiyan Province, Afghanistan. The capital is the town of Panjab. Panjab contains 5 valleys (Darai Sia, Darai Nargis, Darai Mahretuspus, Darai Ghurguri and Darai Taquab-Barg), the water running through the 5 valleys meet in the centre of the district. Its population is entirely Hazara people.

At 2,700 metres above sea level it has the highest altitude in the province, the city of Panjab is located 298 km from the capital Kabul - however travel is difficult especially in winter - the journey takes 14 hours. Two rival parties, Pazdar and Hezb-e-Wahdat, dominate the district and have divided the district between them - there has been fighting between them

See also 
 Panjab, Afghanistan
 Bamiyan Province

References

External links 
 Map of Settlements IMMAP, September 2011 
 Punjab Portal
 Statoids Punjab - (Punjab: Panjab (German); Pendjab, Penjab (French).)

 
Hazarajat